Lynn Martin may refer to:

Lynn Martin (banker), 68th president of the New York Stock Exchange
Lynn Martin (writer), U.S. TV writer
Lynn Morley Martin (born 1939), U.S. politician